Theodore Richard Milford (10 June 1895 – 19 January 1987) was an English clergyman, educator and philanthropist, who was involved in the founding of Oxfam.

Biography
He was born at Yockleton Hall, Shropshire on 10 June 1895. He was eldest of the three children (all boys) of Robert Theodore Milford, who was headmaster of the local preparatory school, and Elspeth Barter, the granddaughter of George Moberly, Bishop of Salisbury. He attended Clifton College, where curriculum included instruction in music as well as the customary classical education.

When the First World War broke out, he volunteered for the army and was posted to the 19th Royal Fusiliers and then commissioned in the Oxford and Buckinghamshire Light Infantry. He fought in Mesopotamia and had two periods of leave in India. In 1918 he was sent to Cairo to train for the Royal Flying Corps, but in 1919 he was invalided and sent home.

In the same year, he went up to Magdalen College, Oxford, to study literae humaniores. He graduated with a first-class degree in 1921. He had been involved with the Student Christian Movement (SCM) at Oxford, a connection which took him back to India to teach first at Alwaye College, Travancore (1921 - 23) and then St. John's College, Agra (1923 - 24). He then returned to England to serve as local SCM secretary in Liverpool between 1924 and 1926.

He spent the academical year 1930-31 training for ordination at Westcott House, Cambridge. He was made a priest in Lucknow, India, in 1934. He returned to England in 1935 to serve as curate at All Hallows, Lombard Street, London. At the same time, he worked as study secretary for the SCM.

He left both positions to become Vicar of St Mary's, the Oxford University church. In this capacity, he founded a philosophical and theological discussion group known as the Colloquy.

On 5 October 1942, he met with several other distinguished individuals in the Old Library at St Mary's (at the instigation of the Quaker Dr Henry Gillett) to discuss how to assist victims of the famine in Axis-occupied Greece caused by the Allied naval blockades. This meeting resulted in the foundation of the Oxford Committee for Famine Relief (later Oxfam, of which Milford was the first chairman.

In 1947, he left his posts at both St Mary's and the Oxford Committee to become canon and chancellor of Lincoln Cathedral, having special responsibility for religious education in the diocese, including Lincoln Theological College. During this time, he wrote his first book, Foolishness to the Greeks (published in 1953), based on his talks for a university mission.

In 1958, he became Master of the Temple in London. He found himself in conflict with the benchers on a number of issues, including the prosecution of Penguin Books related to the publication of Lady Chatterley's Lover; Milford appeared in the defence. He was again chairman of the Oxford Committee for Famine Relief from 1960 to 1965. In 1961, his second book The Valley of Decision was published, exploring the moral problems posed by atomic weapons (the book emerged from Milford's participation in a working party of the British Council of Churches).

In 1968, he left the Temple and retired to Shaftesbury, where he ran a group studying Teilhard de Chardin, in whom Milford had a great sympatethic interest. In retirement, he wrote a book of verse entitled Belated Harvest (published 1978) and  some privately published memoirs. He died on 19 January 1987.

Personal life
He married Nancy Dickens Bourchier, daughter of the solicitor Ernest Hawksley and great-granddaughter of Charles Dickens, in 1932. They had two daughters. She died in 1936; the following year, he married Margaret Nowell Smith, daughter of Nowell Charles Smith, who had been headmaster of Sherborne School (and who had appointed Milford's father to be a housemaster at the same school in 1911). They had a son who died in infancy, and a further two daughters. His personal interests included chess, music and sailing.

References

1895 births
1987 deaths
20th-century English Anglican priests
English philanthropists
People educated at Clifton College
Clergy from Shropshire
Alumni of Magdalen College, Oxford
Masters of the Temple
20th-century British philanthropists
British Army personnel of World War I
Royal Fusiliers officers
Oxfordshire and Buckinghamshire Light Infantry officers
Royal Flying Corps officers
19th-century Anglican theologians
20th-century Anglican theologians